Kofta is a family of meatball or meatloaf dishes found in Balkan, Middle Eastern, North African, South Caucasian, South Asian and Central Asian cuisines. In the simplest form, koftas consist of balls of minced meatusually beef, chicken, pork, lamb or mutton, or a mixturemixed with spices and sometimes other ingredients. The earliest known recipes are found in early Arab cookbooks and call for ground lamb. 

There are many national and regional variations. There are also vegetable and uncooked versions. Shapes vary and include balls, patties, and cylinders. Sizes typically vary from that of a golf ball to that of an orange.

Etymology
The earliest extant use of the word in the Urdu language is attested from the year 1665 in Mulla Nusrati's ʿAlī Nāma. It was first used in English in Qanoon-e-Islam in 1832, and then by James Wise in 1883. The languages of the region of the kofta's origin have adopted the word with minor phonetic variations. Similar foods are called in other languages croquettes, dumplings, meatballs, rissoles, and turnovers.

History 
The first appearance of recipes for kofta are in the earliest Arab cookbooks. The earliest recipes are for large ground lamb meatballs triple-glazed in a mixture of saffron and egg yolk. This glazing method spread to the West, where it is referred to as "gilding" or "endoring". Koftas moved to India; according to Alan Davidson, Nargisi Kofta was served at the Mughal court.

Koftas are found from the Indian subcontinent through Central Asia, the Middle East, the Balkans, and northern Africa. Koftas are found in the traditional cuisines of Afghanistan, Albania, Bosnia and Herzegovina, Bulgaria, Georgia, Armenia, Azerbaijan, Greece, India, Iran, Morocco, Pakistan, Romania, Serbia, and Turkey. In Turkey it is "a preferred offering at communal gatherings of all kinds", according to Engin Akin. In Armenia and Azerbaijan it is, along with dolma, lavash, harissa, kebabs, and pahlava, a dish of "clearly symbolic ethnic significance" often argued over by gastronationalists attempting to claim it as one of their own country's traditional dishes that has been co-opted by the other country. Kofta is a popular dish among Assyrian people.

Variations
Generally meat is mixed with spices and often other ingredients such as rice, bulgur, vegetables, or eggs to form a paste. They can be grilled, fried, steamed, poached, baked, or marinated, and may be served with a rich spicy sauce or in a soup or stew. Koftas are sometimes made from fish or vegetables rather than red meat. Some versions are stuffed with nuts, cheese, or eggs. Generally the size can vary from the "size of an orange to the size of a golf ball", although some variants are outside that range; tabriz koftesi, which average  in diameter, are the largest. They can be shaped in various forms including patties, balls, or cylinders. Some versions are uncooked.

Examples 

 Chiftele, a Romanian version using ground pork mixed with mashed potatoes.
 Çiğ köfte, a Turkish and Armenian version made with bulgur and sometimes raw meat.
Ćufte, a Bosnian style of kofta, typically made from ground beef or ground lamb, and served with a side of cooked potatoes and a salad.
İnegöl köfte, a Turkish style of kofta.
Islama köfte, a steamed kofta from Turkey.
 Kibbeh, a Middle Eastern dish in which includes kofte, sometimes served raw.
Analı kızlı, a Turkish soup.
 Kofte Chawal, an Indian dish that has meat or vegetable balls in a curry sauce. There are many variations using different ingredients for the balls, such as kofta curries made with paneer, chicken or mutton.
 Koofteh Berenji, Koofteh Hamedani, Koofteh Nar, Koofteh Tabrizi and Koofteh Shirin-e Kermanshahi are all Iranian variants of kofta.
 Nargisi Kofta, an Indian dish in which a hard-boiled egg is wrapped in the kofta mixture.
 Pishtha, a meatball mentioned in the Sushrutha Samhita.
Şiş köfte, a Turkish kebab-style kofta.
 Sulu köfte, a Turkish kofta soup or stew.
 Tomatokeftedes, a Greek vegetarian version of kofta which uses tomatoes.
 Ktzitzot Khubeza - an Israeli kofta made of mallow, garlic and bread crumbs mixed with egg whites and yolks.

See also

 List of meatball dishes
 Bobotie
 Ćevapi
 Ćufte
 Falafel
 Frikadeller
 Hamburger
 Kabab koobideh
 Mititei
 Scotch egg
 Shami kebab
 Shish taouk
 Yuvarlakia

References

Urdu-language words and phrases
Arab cuisine
Assyrian cuisine
Balkan cuisine
South Asian cuisine
Central Asian cuisine
Middle Eastern cuisine 
Meatballs
 
Middle Eastern grilled meats

hu:Török konyha#Húsgombócok